Wang Jing is a Chinese mountaineer, author, entrepreneur and member of The Explorers Club in the United States. Wang Jing is best known for her feat in becoming the fastest woman in the world to complete the Explorers Grand Slam (Last Degree) in 143 days (4 months and 23 days) and the fastest woman to climb Seven Summits with an assist from helicopters (combined Mount Kosciuszko and Carstensz lists in 138 days, which is 4 months and 18 days). The Explorers Grand Slam involves reaching the highest peak on every continent plus at a minimum of skiing the last degree (111 km) to the North and South poles. Wang Jing recorded this adventure in her book Silence of the Summit, which was published in English in December 2018.

Toread 

Wang Jing is the chairwoman, CEO, and co-founder of Toread Holdings Group Co., Ltd. In China. The company offers outdoor products including clothing, shoes, and equipment, and went public on Shenzhen Stock Exchange in 2009. It was named by Forbes Asia's 200 Best Under A Billion in 2014.

Mountaineering 

On January 15, 2014, Wang Jing reached the South Pole, marking the start of her Explorers Grand Slam journey. The Seven Summits Jing climbed included Vinson Massif in Antarctica, Aconcagua of South America, Kilimanjaro of Africa, Carstensz Pyramid of Oceania, Elbrus Summit of Europe, Mount Everest of Asia, Denali of North America and Mount Kosciuszko of Australia – covering both the Messner and Bass lists of the Seven Summits.

Wang Jing and a team of Sherpas caused controversy by becoming the only team to reach the summit of Mount Everest after the 2014 Mount Everest ice avalanche that killed 16 Sherpas. Because Jing and her team used a helicopter to get from Base Camp to Camp 2, Elizabeth Hawley put an asterisk next to her ascent marking it aviation assisted, followed by the Nepalese government providing her with a summit certificate for "her successful ascent in a time of crisis and uncertainty." As of 2016, helicopters now carry loads for Sherpa to Camp 1 as a matter of standard practice.

Jing received the title "International-Mountaineer 2014" and also "Nepal-China goodwill ambassador-2015" from the Nepalese government.

Everest Future Foundation 

Wang Jing established the Everest Future Foundation to improve the standard of living of the Sherpa community, more specifically, building their schools, monasteries, hospitals and contributing to other welfare activities. One example is the Khumjung Gompa, a monastery located in the Khumjung village at the foot of the sacred peak of Khumbila at an altitude of 3,790m. This monastery is an important source of spiritual guidance to the local communities. On the 25th of April 2015 when an earthquake struck leaving the monastery severely damaged, locals did not dare enter the monastery with the fear of sudden collapse.

The Jing Foundation donated 13,000,000 Rupees to support the reconstruction of Khumjung Gumba. This donation will go a long way in funding the reconstruction of this important building in 2017. Jing has also donated to the Nepalese health and educational sectors in order to raise their current standard. Along with this, she participated in activities cleaning up garbage in the Qomolungma high-altitude named "Clean The Mountain".

Books 

Wang Jing has also authored two books based on her mountaineering experiences, Life at Altitude and Silence of the Summit. The first book was first published in Chinese in 2013, telling Jing's story from a sportswear businessperson to a mountaineer. The second book, Silence of the Summit, was published in Chinese in 2016, focusing on her expedition in 2014. The English edition of Silence of the Summit was published in 2018.

Expeditions

References

Living people
Chinese summiters of Mount Everest
Summiters of the Seven Summits
Explorers of Antarctica
Explorers of the Arctic
Female polar explorers
Female climbers
1975 births